Gobiopterus is a genus of gobies native to fresh, marine and brackish waters of the coastal areas around the Indian and Pacific oceans.

Species
There are currently 10 recognized species in this genus:
 Gobiopterus birtwistlei (Herre, 1935)
 Gobiopterus brachypterus (Bleeker, 1855)
 Gobiopterus chuno (F. Hamilton, 1822)
 Gobiopterus lacustris (Herre, 1927) (Lacustrine goby)
 Gobiopterus macrolepis (T. Y. Cheng, 1965)
 Gobiopterus mindanensis (Herre, 1944)
 Gobiopterus panayensis (Herre, 1944)
 Gobiopterus semivestitus (Munro, 1949)
 Gobiopterus smithi (Menon & Talwar, 1973)
 Gobiopterus stellatus (Herre, 1927) (Dwarf freshwater goby)

References

Gobionellinae